Daniel H. Tulley is a United States Air Force major general who serves as the vice director for joint force development of the Joint Staff since July 2021, replacing Major General David R. Iverson. He most recently served as the commander of the 379th Air Expeditionary Wing. Previously, he was the senior military assistant to the Secretary of the Air Force. In February 2021, he was nominated for promotion to major general.

References

Living people
Place of birth missing (living people)
Recipients of the Defense Superior Service Medal
Recipients of the Legion of Merit
United States Air Force generals
United States Air Force personnel of the War in Afghanistan (2001–2021)
Year of birth missing (living people)